Henry L. Norton (1873-1932) was an American sculptor and manufacturer of bronze tablets active in New England.

Norton was born in North Canaan, Connecticut, and later lived in West Springfield, Boston, and Winthrop, Massachusetts. During World War I, he served with the Canadian Army and was wounded seven times. Subsequently, he ran a bronze tablet foundry in Boston.

Selected works 
 Rhode Island Red Monument, 1925
 Henry Knox Trail markers, Massachusetts, 1927
 War Memorial, Westford, Massachusetts
 Monument to All Wars, Ellington, Connecticut

References 
 Henry Knox and the Revolutionary War Trail in Western Massachusetts, Bernard A. Drew, McFarland, 2012, page 211. .
 Smithsonian Institution, Save Outdoor Sculpture, Rhode Island survey, 1993, IAS RI000075.
 Smithsonian Institution, Save Outdoor Sculpture, Massachusetts survey, 1997, IAS MA000744.

19th-century American sculptors
1873 births
1932 deaths
People from Litchfield County, Connecticut
People from West Springfield, Massachusetts
People from Winthrop, Massachusetts
20th-century American sculptors